Zoe Anne Bruce (born 15 October 1975) is a British sport shooter, World Championship medallist and former British record holder.

In May 2017, Bruce won the Women's 50m prone rifle at the International Shooting Competition of Hannover, setting a new British and English Record of 624.3. The British record was broken less than a month later by the Scot Seonaid McIntosh, but Bruce retains the English record. In July 2018, she was selected as a member of the Great Britain team to the 2018 ISSF World Shooting Championships where she won a bronze medal in the Women's 50m prone rifle team event with her teammates Jennifer McIntosh and Seonaid McIntosh. This was the first Senior World Championship medal won by Great Britain in a 50 metre rifle event since 1982.

References

External links

Living people
1975 births
British female sport shooters
ISSF rifle shooters
21st-century British women